Tom R. Burns (born 1937) is an American/Swedish sociologist, professor emeritus of sociology at the University of Uppsala in Sweden and founder of the Uppsala Theory Circle.

Biography 
He grew up in Arkansas, and was in a Franciscan Monastery for a number of years. As a teenager, he attended Phillips Academy Andover in Massachusetts, before going to Stanford University to study physics and mathematics, where he obtained his BS in physics in 1959. In the years 1959–60 he studied physics and sociology for almost two years at the University of Warsaw, Poland as an exchange student from Stanford. He returned to Stanford, where he obtained his MA in sociology in 1962 and his PhD in Sociology in 1969. 

He started his academic career as Assistant Professor at the George Washington University, and moved to the University of New Hampshire in 1968, where he became Associate Professor in 1973. From 1976 to 1983 he was senior researcher at the Scandinavian Institutes for Administrative Research. In this period he also was Professor at the Stockholm University in Sweden from 1978 to 1980, Professor at the University of Oslo in Norway from 1979 to 1982. 

In 1982 he was appointed the position of Professor of Sociology at the University of Uppsala, which he held until 2002 after which he became Emeritus Professor. Back in the United States he was also Clarence J. Robinson University Professor at the George Mason University from 1987 to 1990. From 2003 to 2006 he was NORFA Professor at the Centre for International Environment and Development Studies at the Norwegian University of Life Sciences. He was Visiting professor at the Lisbon University Institute (ISCTE), in Portugal from 2007 to 2013.  

Among his other professional engagements, he has been Jean Monnet Visiting Professor at the European University Institute, Florence, Italy, 2002; Visiting Scholar, Stanford University, Spring, 2002, Spring, 2004–2008; Fellow at Swedish Collegium for Advanced Study in the Social Sciences (Spring, 1992; Autumn, 1998), and Fellow at the European University Institute (Spring, 1998).

Work

Actor-system dynamics (ASD) 
Beginning in the early 1970s, Burns collaborated with a number of researchers, such as Thomas Baumgartner, Walter F. Buckley, Matthew Cooper, Philippe DeVille, David Meeker, Bernard Gauci, among others. They have been developing a new theory complex, which came to be referred to as actor-system dynamics (ASD), a new social systems theory, substantially different from Parson's systems theory and the systems theory later developed by Niklas Luhmann. 

This approach brought human agents in a natural and coherent way into system modelling. It saw agents (individuals and collectives) in their strategems and ploys as constrained as well as enabled by system structures, but also as forces structuring and restructuring systems and, in some instances, creating entirely new ones. 

This theoretical work always went hand in hand with a wide range of empirical investigations.  It built bridges not only within the social sciences and humanities but also between the social sciences and humanities, on the one hand, and the natural, technical, and medical sciences, on the other hand. Research projects on the environment, technology, engineering, and medicine were an expression of this interdisciplinarity.

The ASD network 
The ASD network led by Burns developed a complex of interrelated theories. Besides the ASD theory core, Burns and several of his collaborators developed a socially embedded, role based game theory, generalized game theory,  which recognizes the social and psychological complexity of human motivation and action, the dilemmas and contradictions often facing social agents, and the problems matters of game equilibria and disequilibria.

Social rule system theory 
On the basis of ASD theory Burns and Dietz developed a non-biological theory of sociocultural evolution, which they called Social rule system theory. 

Social rule system theory was formulated in the 1980s by Burns and Helena Flam together with others was a contribution to the New Institutionalism.

Sociology of human consciousness 
In the 1990s a sociology of human consciousness was developed by Burns, Erik Engdahl, Nora Machado, and Sviatoslav Korepov based on sociology and social psychology traditions, in particular inspired by George Herbert Mead. In addition, a number of new theoretical concepts such as social structuring, meta-power and relational control, organizational dissonance and contradiction, and public policy paradigm theory were formulated and applied in empirical investigations. 

On a policy oriented level, the risks of complex socio-technical systems, the emergence of post-parliamentary democracy and new forms of governance, and the instabilities and ecological and social destructiveness of capitalism have been particular foci of attention since the early 1990s.

Uppsala Theory Circle 
Burns was the founder of the Uppsala Theory Circle (UTC) at Uppsala University, devoted to the development of sociological and social science theory and its applications in empirical and policy research. UTC functioned as an international, interdisciplinary collegium of scholars. A major pole of UTC was located in Uppsala, Sweden, but with contributors and participants found in other parts of Europe as well as in China, Africa, and the Americas. 

The group conducted regular seminars, workshops, etc. often engaging leading Swedish and international scholars who were fellows at The Swedish Collegium for Advanced Studies in the Social Sciences. Beginning in the mid-1980s, this institution brought many distinguished scholars to Uppsala, in particular. The UTC was particularly active in the 1980s and 1990s. Since 2000, much of the core, which was engaged initially in Uppsala, has dispersed within and outside of Sweden.

Publications 
Burns and his collaborators have published more than 10 books and numerous articles on theory and methodology as well as more empirically and policy-oriented in the areas of socio-economics, markets and market regulation, the sociology of technology, environment, and natural resources, administration and management, governance and politics.
 Transitions to Alternative Energy Systems: Entrepreneurs, New Technologies, and Social Change (1984).
 Man, Decisions, Society (1985), 
 The Shaping of Socio-economic Systems (1986), 
 The Shaping of Social Organization: Social Rule System Theory and Its Applications (1987),
 Creative Democracy (1988),
 Societal Decision-making: Democratic Challenges to State Technocracy (1992), 
 Municipal Entrepreneurship and Energy Policy: A Five Nation Study of Politics, Innovation, and Social Change (1994),

References

External links

 Tom R. Burns, Post-parliamentary democracy
 Advancing Socio-economics: An Institutionalist Perspective, About the Contributors (bio note) 
 Tom R Burns and Masoud Kamali, The state(s) of Iraq, Asia Times, Mar 10, 2005 (bio note)

Living people
American sociologists
American systems scientists
Academics from Arkansas
Stanford University alumni
University of Warsaw alumni
George Washington University faculty
University of New Hampshire faculty
Academic staff of the University of Oslo
Academic staff of Stockholm University
Academic staff of Lund University
Academic staff of Uppsala University
1937 births